Ntractive was a privately held software development company based in Grand Forks, North Dakota that marketed business software to small to medium-sized companies. Established in 2006, the company's main product was Elements CRM, a Mac CRM (Customer Relationship Management) application aimed at small business that use Mac OS X computers, iPads and iPhones.,  Elements CRM was a cloud computing web application that employed a unique site-specific browser to merge desktop and web application functionality. The product was first introduced to the public at a keynote address during Apple's 2007 World Wide Developer's Conference. The official launch of Elements SBM (the products original name) 1.0 took place at Macworld 2009. The product was then renamed to Elements CRM and with its 2.0 release was awarded the honor of Apple "Staff Pick" in July, 2009.

History

Origins 
The architecture and overall development of the Elements CRM product line initially began in 2003 by the company's founder, Justin Bartak.  The company later founded in January 2006 by Justin Bartak and Dale Jensen as a company specializing in a cloud computing Mac CRM (Customer Relationship Management) for Apple hardware and devices. The company's Elements CRM Platform is part desktop and part cloud and is powered by Webkit.

The company ceased operations at the end of 2016.

Methodology

Mac CRM 
Mac Customer Relationship Management (Mac CRM) is an approach to managing a company’s interaction with current and future customers on Apple Inc Desktop computers and iOS devices only. Mac CRM solutions are not web-based only applications that use a web browser for interaction. Instead, a Mac CRM is a combination of a cloud based app built with Apple's programming language Objective-C or Swift (programming language). Mac CRMs involve using Apple only devices and technology to organize, automate, and synchronize sales, marketing, customer service, and technical support.

Products and Services

Elements CRM 

Elements CRM  is a Mac Customer Relationship Management (Mac CRM) solution for Apple business. Offered as a subscription-based service, Elements CRM is part desktop and part cloud. Its main functions include managing leads and contact information, tracking communication history, managing tasks and follow ups, tracking email communication, creating estimates and invoices and managing projects.

Elements CRM iOS 
Elements CRM iOS  is a universal mobile app for the iPhone, iPad and iPad mini. Elements CRM iOS is an add-on to the Elements CRM desktop app. The iPad CRM version of Elements CRM iOS looks, works and feels like the desktop app. The iPhone CRM app is a limited version of the most important functions of the desktop app.

Elements CRM Mail 

Elements CRM Mail is an email tracking tool that works in conjunction with Elements CRM. It monitors the user's email server for communication between leads and clients stored in Elements CRM. When a match is found, a copy of the email is stored in Elements CRM within the client's record.

References

Cloud computing
MacOS software
IOS software
Macintosh software companies
Business software companies
Customer relationship management software companies
Customer relationship management software
Cloud applications
ERP software companies
ERP software
Software companies based in North Dakota
Companies established in 2006
Defunct software companies of the United States